The 1963–64 season was the 40th season in the existence of AEK Athens F.C. and the fifth consecutive season in the top flight of Greek football. They competed in the Alpha Ethniki, the Greek Cup and the European Cup. The season began on 15 September 1963 and finished on 17 June 1964.

Overview

The management of AEK Athens, in the summer of 1963, proceeded with a brave restructuring of the team's roster. The Syrian Ibrahim Mughrabi returned to his homeland, Thanasis Gouvas and the Cypriots, Panikos Krystallis and Dimitris Zagylos left, while Giannis Marditsis, after his participation in the first match against Monaco, effectively withdrew from the team. Several players were added to the roster, such as the goalkeeper, Thodoros Maniateas from Panthisiakos and Panagiotis Charalambidis from Iraklis and most importantly, Fanis Tasinos who emerged as the best left midfielder of the previous season with Pagorinthiakos and the striker of Atromitos, Kostas Papageorgiou. Along with the renewal of the roster, the administration of yellow–blacks surprised everyone by removing from the technical leadership Jenő Csaknády, the coach who crowned them Champion in the previous season. The Austrian Heinrich Müller was hired in his place. One of the first innovations under the new coach was the "removal of permanency" in the position under the goalposts, of the team's main goalkeeper Stelios Serafidis and the promotion to the starting eleven of the then substitute goalkeeper, Vangelis Petrakis.

AEK started their competitive obligations, playing for the first time in their history in the UEFA competitions, as they qualified in the Preliminary round of the European Cup, having won the championship of the previous season. The draw brought them against the French champions, Monaco. The first appearance in a UEFA match quickly turned into a nightmare as they faced an imposing 7–2 defeat at Stade Municipal du Ray, on 18 September. The remach in Athens on 2 October, was purely procedural, as 1–1 draw couldn't change anything in the qualification outcome, as it was secured by the Monegasques from the first match.

AEK started the Championship race with 3 losses and 1 draw conceding a total of 8 goals in these games. Taking into account the 7–2 defeat in the team's maiden European appearance in Monaco, Serafidis returned to the starting eleven, but precious ground had been already lost in the title race. In the next 14 Championship matches, the yellow–blacks conceded only 3 goals, 2 of which in their fourth defeat in Drama against Doxa Drama, which gave a greater advantage to the advancing Panathinaikos. AEK eventually finished in third place in the table, 13 points from the top. The 72 goals they achieved won them the best attack, while after 4 consecutive firsts of Kostas Nestoridis, the title of the top scorer of the league "passed" to Mimis Papaioannou, who with 29 goals kept the award within the club.

In the Greek Cup AEK eliminated Anagennisi Arta by crushing them away from home on 26 April with 0–7. The round of 16 brought AEK against PAOK again away from home on 24 May, where AEK won 0–3 in extra time, after the 0–0 at the regular time. The away matches continued in the quarter-finals, where AEK faced Proodeftiki on 3 June at Karaiskakis Stadium and eliminated them by 0–1. The draw for the Semi-finals brought Panathinaikos and Olympiacos against each other at Leoforos Alexandras Stadium and Pierikos against AEK in Katerini. On 17 June the clearly superior AEK won by 1–3 and easily advanced to the Final. In the other Semi-final, which was held on the same day, a derby took place that was destined to go down in history for non-competitive reasons and characterized as the "Holocaust of Leoforos". After the match ended a draw at the regular time and the relaxed tempo by all players during the second half, as well as the extra time, enraged the crowd of fans of both teams and now certain that the match was fixed for a replay match to be set, broke the railings, destroyed the billboards and floodlights of the stadium and invaded the pitch. There they gathered all the wooden objects and set them on fire, and then attacked football players, referees and coaches, together and without getting involved with each other. The police did everything they could, but with the extent of the incidents, the intervention of the public prosecutor was called for. The HFF punished both teams for the events and fearing worse incidents, did not set one and recognized the finalist AEK, as the winner of the tournament by declaring it to UEFA as the country's representative in the organization for the next season's UEFA Cup Winners' Cup. Many years later, the HFF, recognizing the unjustified gap that had been created, also awarded the trophy to AEK.

Players

Squad information

NOTE: The players are the ones that have been announced by the AEK Athens' press release. No edits should be made unless a player arrival or exit is announced. Updated 30 June 1964, 23:59 UTC+2.

Transfers

In

Out

Renewals

Overall transfer activity

Expenditure:  ₯700,000

Income:  ₯0

Net Total:  ₯700,000

Pre-season and friendlies

Alpha Ethniki

League table

Results summary

Results by Matchday

Fixtures

Greek Cup

Matches

As Panathinaikos and Olympiacos were ejected from the competition, the Final was scratched and AEK Athens were awarded the Cup.

European Cup

Preliminary round

Statistics

Squad statistics

! colspan="11" style="background:#FFDE00; text-align:center" | Goalkeepers
|-

! colspan="11" style="background:#FFDE00; color:black; text-align:center;"| Defenders
|-

! colspan="11" style="background:#FFDE00; color:black; text-align:center;"| Midfielders
|-

! colspan="11" style="background:#FFDE00; color:black; text-align:center;"| Forwards
|-

|}

Disciplinary record

|-
! colspan="17" style="background:#FFDE00; text-align:center" | Goalkeepers

|-
! colspan="17" style="background:#FFDE00; color:black; text-align:center;"| Defenders

|-
! colspan="17" style="background:#FFDE00; color:black; text-align:center;"| Midfielders

|-
! colspan="17" style="background:#FFDE00; color:black; text-align:center;"| Forwards

|-
|}

References

External links
AEK Athens F.C. Official Website

AEK Athens F.C. seasons
AEK Athens